Wilhelm Glacier is an Antarctic glacier 2 nautical miles (3.7 km) north of Olson Glacier, draining the north part of the west slopes of Malta Plateau and flowing west into Seafarer Glacier in Victoria Land. Mapped by United States Geological Survey (USGS) from surveys and U.S. Navy air photos, 1960–64. Named by Advisory Committee on Antarctic Names (US-ACAN) for Robert C. Wilhelm, a member of the United States Antarctic Research Program (USARP) glaciological party at Roosevelt Island in 1967–68.

Glaciers of Victoria Land
Borchgrevink Coast